Delgo may refer to:

 Delgo, Sudan
 Delgo (film), 2008 animated feature film
 Lior Delgo, investor, co-founder of VideoSurf